Toolijooa railway station is a closed railway station on the South Coast railway line in New South Wales, Australia. The station opened on 2 June 1893 and closed on 19 October 1974

References

Disused regional railway stations in New South Wales
Railway stations in Australia opened in 1893
Railway stations closed in 1974
1974 disestablishments in Australia